Barbados competed at the 1996 Summer Olympics in Atlanta, United States.

Results by event

Athletics
Men's 100 metres
 Obadele Thompson
 Kirk Cummins

Men's 200 metres
 Obadele Thompson

Men's Decathlon
 Victor Houston

Women's 400 metres
 Melissa Straker
 Heat — 52.92 (→ did not advance)

Boxing
Men's Featherweight (– 57 kg)
John Kelman
 First Round — Lost to János Nagy (Hungary), referee stopped contest in third round

Men's Middleweight (– 75 kg)
Thomas Marcus
 First Round — Lost to Mohamed Bahari (Algeria), referee stopped contest in second round (02:20)

Gymnastics
 Shane de Freitas

Judo
 Andrew Payne

Sailing
 O'Neal Marshall
 Rodney Reader

Shooting
 Michael Maskell

Swimming
Men's 100m Backstroke
 Nick Neckles
 Heat – 57.91 (→ did not advance, 37th place)

Men's 200m Backstroke
 Nick Neckles
 Heat – 2:05.88 (→ did not advance, 28th place)

Women's 50m Freestyle
 Leah Martindale
 Heat – 25.76
 Final – 25.49 (→ 5th place)

Women's 100m Freestyle
 Leah Martindale
 Heat – 56.13
 B-Final – 56.03 (→ 12th place)

See also
Barbados at the 1995 Pan American Games

References
Official Olympic Reports
sports-reference

Nations at the 1996 Summer Olympics
1996
Olympics